Find a Grave is a website that allows the public to search and add to an online database of cemetery records. It is owned by Ancestry.com. Its stated mission is "to help people from all over the world work together to find, record and present final disposition information as a virtual cemetery experience." Volunteers can create memorials, upload photos of grave markers or deceased persons, transcribe photos of headstones, and more. , the site claimed more than 226 million memorials.

History

The site was created in 1995 by Salt Lake City resident Jim Tipton to support his hobby of visiting the burial sites of celebrities. He later added an online forum. Find a Grave was launched as a commercial entity in 1998, first as a trade name and then incorporated in 2000. The site later expanded to include graves of non-celebrities, in order to allow online visitors to pay respect to their deceased relatives or friends.

In 2013, Tipton sold Find a Grave to Ancestry.com, stating the genealogy company had "been linking and driving traffic to the site for several years. Burial information is a wonderful source for people researching their family history." In a September 30, 2013 press release, Ancestry.com officials said they would "launch a new mobile app, improve customer support, [and] introduce an enhanced edit system for submitting updates to memorials, foreign-language support, and other site improvements."

In March 2017, a beta website for a redesigned Find a Grave was launched at gravestage.com. Between May 29 and July 10 of that year the beta website was migrated to new.findagrave.com, and a new front end for it was deployed at beta.findagrave.com. In November 2017, the new site became live and the old site was deprecated. On August 20, 2018, the original Find a Grave website was officially retired.

Content and features
The website contains listings of cemeteries and graves from around the world. American cemeteries are organized by state and county, and many cemetery records contain Google Maps (with GPS coordinates supplied by contributors) and photographs of the cemeteries and gravesites. Individual grave records may contain dates and places of birth and death, biographical information, cemetery and plot information, photographs (of the grave marker, the individual, etc.), and contributor information.

Interment listings are added by individuals, genealogical societies, cemetery associations, and other institutions such as the International Wargraves Photography Project.

Contributors must register as members to submit listings, called memorials, on the site. The submitter becomes the manager of the listing but may transfer management. Only the current manager of a listing may edit it, although any member may use the site's features to send correction requests to the listing's manager. Managers may add links to other listings of deceased spouses, parents, and siblings for genealogical purposes.

Any member may also add photographs and notations to individual listings; notations may include images of flowers, flags, religious, or other symbols, and often include a message of sympathy or condolence. Members may post requests for photos of a specific grave; these requests will be automatically sent to other members who have registered their location as being near that grave. 

The website is sometimes recommended as a resource for genealogy research.

Find a Grave also maintains lists of memorials of famous persons by their "claim to fame", such as Medal of Honor recipients, religious figures, and educators. Find a Grave exercises editorial control over these listings.

Policies
Website policy is to remove memorials or transfer their management at the request of an immediate family member. In January 2022, following complaints, Find a Grave announced a new policy for memorials of recently deceased persons. Under the new policy, any photos or personal information, including obituaries, are hidden for three months.

See also

 Canadian Headstones
 Interment.net
 Random Acts of Genealogical Kindness
 Tombstone tourist
 United States National Cemetery System's nationwide gravesite locator

References

Citations

Sources

External links

  

1995 establishments in Utah
Collaborative projects
Genealogy databases
American genealogy websites
Internet properties established in 1995
Online person databases
Cemeteries
Acknowledgements of death
2013 mergers and acquisitions